The 2011 Wainwright Roaming Buffalo Classic was held from November 18 to 21 at the Wainwright Curling Club in Wainwright, Alberta as part of the 2011–12 World Curling Tour. The purse for the event was CAD$50,000, and the winner of the event, Brent Pierce, received CAD$12,000. The event was held in a triple-knockout format.

Teams

Knockout results

A event

B event

C event

Playoffs

External links

Wainwright Roaming Buffalo Classic
Wainwright Roaming Buffalo Classic
Wainwright Roaming Buffalo Classic